Alice Feeney is a British novelist of the 21st century, writing in the mystery and thriller genres.

Before becoming a published writer, Feeney was a producer and journalist at the BBC for fifteen or sixteen years. She started there at age 21 and was a producer for the One O’clock News, and also a reporter and news editor, and producer for arts and entertainment programmes.

She started writing her first novel, Sometimes I Lie, when she was 30, writing in her spare time and on the train to work. She took the Faber Academy writing course, finishing the book and course at about the same time.

In 2019, Fox bought the television rights to Sometimes I Lie, and in November 2019 a project for a television series starring Feeney enthusiast Sarah Michelle Gellar was revealed. Robin Swicord was engaged to adapt the book, and Ellen DeGeneres and Jeff Kleeman, as well as Gellar and Swicord, were to be executive producers. In 2020, Jessica Chastain, Kristen Campo, and Endeavor Content acquired the television rights to His & Hers.

Bibliography

Feeney, Alice (2021). Rock Paper Scissors. Flatiron. .

References

British mystery writers
21st-century British novelists
21st-century British women writers
Living people
Women mystery writers
British women novelists
Year of birth missing (living people)